Abby Bishop (born 29 November 1988) is an Australian professional basketball forward/center who plays for Southside Flyers of the Australian WNBL. She has played for the Australian Institute of Sport from 2005–2006, the Canberra Capitals from 2006–2010, Dandenong Rangers from 2010–2011 Canberra Capitals. She is currently a member of the Adelaide Lightning (2016/2017). She is a member of the Australia women's national basketball team and won a gold medal during the 2007 Oceania World Qualifications series and a bronze medal at the 2012 Summer Olympics.

Personal life
Bishop was born on 29 November 1988. In August 2013, Bishop took custody of her two-day-old niece, Zala Kate Bishop.

Basketball
Bishop is a tall forward. In 2008, she was featured as a basketball star on myFiba.

Bishop played in the South East Australian Basketball League (SEABL) over the winter 2011 season for Swinburne Kilsyth Lady Cobras alongside other WNBL stars Eva Afeaki and Chantella Perera. She took leave from Swinburne Kilsyth Lady Cobras duties during June while touring with the Australian Opals team in China where Australia competing in the Qi Yi Four Nation tournament along with Brazil and New Zealand.

Professional

WNBA
Bishop's rookie season in the WNBA was in 2010. In her first season in the WNBA playing for the Seattle Storm, she only played in 16 games, averaging 6.8 minutes per game. In these appearances, she averaged 2.8 points and 1.3 rebounds per game. Almost all her games and minutes came near the end of the season when the Storm head coach, Brian Agler rest the team's starters. While the Storm won their second WNBA championship in 2010, Bishop did not play in any post season games in her rookie year because she had a concussion during practice for the post season. She did not play with the Storm during the 2011 WNBA season as she wanted to focus on making the 2012 Australian Olympic squad.  Bishop said: "I've decided to stay in Australia and focus on London. I know it's a year away, maybe over a year away now. But for me, it's about staying here and showing myself to the coaches where if I'm going back to America, it's going to be a little bit harder, not playing. So solely my focus is making that London team." On 20 February 2015, Bishop returned to the Storm after spending five years playing for the WNBL.

WNBL
Bishop has averaged 13.8 points a game, 8.3 rebounds a game and 1.4 assists a game in her WNBL career. She had a scholarship with the Australian Institute of Sport and played for the AIS WNBL team in 2005 and 2006. She played for the Canberra Capitals in the 2006/2007 season, and was with the team again for the 2007/2008 season when she was nineteen-year-old. She stayed with the team for the 2008/2009 season. In a January 2009 game against the AIS, she scored 20 points in the team's 87–51 victory, and in a late January 2009 game against the AIS which Canberra won 99–72, she scored 27 points. In a January 2009 game against the Logan Thunder that Canberra won 76–53, she scored 15 points.

Bishop played in the WNBL in 2010/2011 for the Dandengong Rangers, where she was the team's leader alongside Kate Macleod. She then played for the Adelaide Lightning in 2011/2012. That season, she averaged 16.4 points a game, 8.2 rebounds a game and 2.6 assists a game. In an October 2011 game against the Australian Institute of Sport, she scored 21 points in a 97–47 win for Adelaide.
Bishop won the WNBL 2014/15 League MVP.

National team

Bishop has represented Australia as a member of the Australian's age level teams.  She was a member of the 2005 Australia Junior Women's Team that competed in the World Championships in Tunisia. As a member of the 2006 Junior Women's Team, she earned won a gold medal during the Oceania World Qualification Series and competed in the William Jones Cup in Taiwan. In 2007, she was a member of the Australia women's under-19 junior team that competed at the World Championships in the Slovak Republic. Her team finished fifth. She led the team in minutes played with 231 in 9 games. She made 39 of 83 attempted field goals, for a percentage of 47%. She made 35 out of 54 attempted free throws. She made 32 offensive rebounds, and 64 defensive rebounds. In 2007, she was a member of the Australian Young Women's Team that won a silver medal at the World Championships in Russia. She represented Australia at the 2011 Summer Universiade team in Shenzen, China, where Australia took home a bronze medal.  She was Australia's leading scorer in the tournament.

Bishop has represented Australia as a member of the Australian Opals. As a member of the 2007 team, she won a gold medal during the Oceania World Qualifications series. In 2008, she participated in the Good Luck Beijing 2008 held in China in the lead up to the Olympics.  Her team was joined by national teams from United States, Cuba, Korea, New Zealand and China. Bishop was the youngest player on the team. In July 2010, she participated in a four-day training camp and one game test match against the United States in Connecticut. In 2010, she was a member of the senior women's national team that competed at the World Championships in the Czech Republic. In July 2011, she participated in the Olympic qualification competition. She played in the 2012 Summer Olympic qualifying game against the New Zealand women's national basketball team. In February 2012, she was named to a short list of 24 eligible players to represent Australia at the Olympics. In late April and early May 2012, she was one of four Australian "big" players to participate in a special training camp for the team. She participated in the national team training camp held from 14 to 18 May 2012 at the Australian Institute of Sport. At the 2012 Olympics, she was part of the Australian team that won the bronze medal.

See also
 List of Australian WNBA players
 WNBL Rookie of the Year Award

References

External links

 
 
 
 

1988 births
Living people
Adelaide Lightning players
Australian expatriate basketball people in the United States
Australian Institute of Sport basketball (WNBL) players
Australian women's basketball players
Basketball players at the 2012 Summer Olympics
Canberra Capitals players
Dandenong Rangers players
Medalists at the 2012 Summer Olympics
Olympic basketball players of Australia
Olympic bronze medalists for Australia
Olympic medalists in basketball
People educated at Lake Ginninderra College
Seattle Storm players
Tarbes Gespe Bigorre players
Universiade medalists in basketball
Universiade bronze medalists for Australia
Centers (basketball)
Forwards (basketball)
Medalists at the 2011 Summer Universiade
Undrafted Women's National Basketball Association players